was a Japanese Noh actor, author, and musician during the Muromachi period. He is the father of the well-known playwright .

Theater
Kan'ami's career began in Obata, Nabari-shi, Mie when he founded a sarugaku theater group in the Kansai region on the main Honshu island. The troupe moved to Yamato and formed the Yuzaki theater company, which would become the school of Noh theater. He grew in popularity and began making trips to Kyoto to give performances. In 1374, the shōgun Ashikaga Yoshimitsu was in the audience of a performance and was so impressed by it that he became Kan'ami's patron.

Kan'ami was the first playwright to incorporate the Kusemai song and dance style and Dengaku dances from rustic harvest celebrations. He trained his son Zeami Motokiyo in his style, and his son eventually succeeded him as director of the Kanze school of Noh. Kan'ami died in Suruga Province.

Notable works 
Sotoba Komachi
Ji'nen koji
Shiino shōshō
Matsukaze
Motomezuka
Eguchi

Further reading
 Encyclopædia Britannica 2005 Ultimate Reference Suite DVD, article- "Kan'ami"

1333 births
1384 deaths
Noh playwrights
14th-century Japanese male actors
Japanese Buddhists
14th-century Japanese dramatists and playwrights